Marsteller is an unincorporated community in Cambria County, Pennsylvania, United States. Marsteller had its own post office until April 23, 2005; it still has its own ZIP code, 15760.

References

Unincorporated communities in Cambria County, Pennsylvania
Unincorporated communities in Pennsylvania